Scolopia mundii, the mountain saffron, red pear or klipdoring, is a South African tree in the family Salicaceae.

It has dark shiny foliage and bright yellow/orange berries. It is a very adaptable tree and occurs sporadically throughout South Africa, from Cape Town northwards as far as Limpopo. The specific name commemorates Johannes Ludwig Leopold Mund, a German natural history collector who was active in the Cape until 1831.

References

mundii
Trees of South Africa
Flora of South Africa
Ornamental trees